The Yellowhead Pass is a mountain pass across the Continental Divide of the Americas in the Canadian Rockies. It is located on the provincial boundary between the Canadian provinces of Alberta and British Columbia, and lies within Jasper National Park and Mount Robson Provincial Park.

The proposal was rejected in favour of a more direct and southerly route, through the more difficult Kicking Horse Pass, which was opened in 1886. However, both the Grand Trunk Pacific and Canadian Northern Railways used the Yellowhead Pass for their main lines, built c. 1910–1913, and the main line of their successor, the Canadian National Railway, still follows the route. Via Rail's premier passenger train, the Canadian; the Jasper – Prince Rupert train; and the Jasper section of the Rocky Mountaineer use the Yellowhead Pass, which is now used also by the Yellowhead Highway.

It is believed that the pass was named for Pierre Bostonais (nicknamed Tête Jaune, French for "yellow head", because of his blond hair), an Iroquois-Métis trapper employed as a guide by the Hudson's Bay Company. Bostonais led one of the first expeditions for the company to what is now the interior of British Columbia through the pass in 1820.

See also

 List of Rocky Mountain passes on the continental divide
 List of mountain passes

References

External links

Jasper Alberta Yellowhead Pass History
Yellowhead Pass and its People. Valemount Historic Society

Mountain passes of Alberta
Mountain passes of British Columbia
Great Divide of North America
Canadian National Railway facilities
Rail mountain passes of Alberta
Rail mountain passes of British Columbia
National Historic Sites in Alberta
National Historic Sites in British Columbia
Jasper National Park
Borders of Alberta
Borders of British Columbia
Landforms on the National Historic Sites of Canada register